Steven Mackintosh (born 30 April 1967) is an English actor and narrator. He is perhaps best known for his role as Andreas Tanis in the action horror films Underworld: Evolution (2006) and Underworld: Rise of the Lycans (2009).

Mackintosh received a British Academy Television Award nomination for his leading role in the BBC One television film Care (2000). His other notable roles were in the films Lock, Stock and Two Smoking Barrels (1998) and The Land Girls (1998), as well as the first series of Luther (2010).

Early life
Mackintosh was born in Cambridge, England, the son of Dorothy Parris and Malcolm Mackintosh. He attended Icknield Primary School in Sawston, Sawston Village College and Dramawise Theatre School. He made his stage debut aged 12 at the Bush Theatre, London and then landed the lead role in the National Theatre production of Brighton Beach Memoirs.

Career

Film

Mackintosh's first film appearance was in Prick Up Your Ears. He went on to star in Memphis Belle, Twelfth Night, and David Leland's Land Girls with Rachel Weisz and Anna Friel and co-starred with Rupert Graves in Different For Girls as a transgender woman. He played Winston in Guy Ritchie's film Lock, Stock and Two Smoking Barrels. His other notable films include Roger Michell's The Mother, The Jacket, Good with Viggo Mortensen, Underworld: Evolution and Underworld: Rise of the Lycans. He played Tony in Rupert Wyatt's feature The Escapist and Kertzer in Film 4's The Scouting Book For Boys. Mackintosh played Ivan Lewis in the big screen version of The Sweeney. He played Jack in Set Fire to the Stars with Elijah Wood and worked with Michael Caton Jones for the second time on his film Urban Hymn.

Radio

He played Maj Sjöwall and Per Wahlöö's fictional police detective Martin Beck in the BBC Radio drama series The Martin Beck Killings.

Television

Mackintosh played DS Winter in the 10 part series Lucky Man, created by Stan Lee for Carnival films and Sky TV. He played Robbo in From There to Here by BAFTA winning writer Peter Bowker for the BBC and played John Coniston in the acclaimed Inside Men for BBC 1.  His other numerous credits include: Luther, Lost Christmas, The Other Boleyn Girl, The Buddha of Suburbia, Prime Suspect and Our Mutual Friend. Mackintosh won Best Actor at the Royal Television Society Awards and a Best Actor Nomination at the BAFTAs for his role in Care for the BBC. In recent years he has become a popular choice to narrate documentaries. He replaced Jamie Theakston to narrate the BBC police documentary, Traffic Cops. He also narrates on the documentary Aircrash Confidential from Discovery Communications and Saving Lives at Sea on BBC 2.

Personal life

He is married to the actress Lisa Jacobs. They have two daughters, Martha Mackintosh (born 1992) and Blythe Mackintosh (born 1996). He is a fan of Manchester United.

Filmography

Film

Television

References

External links
 
 
 Steven Mackintosh Website

Living people
1967 births
English male child actors
English male film actors
English male musical theatre actors
English male stage actors
English male television actors
English male Shakespearean actors
Alumni of the Sylvia Young Theatre School